Assa-Gueyla Airport  is an airstrip serving the village of `Assa Gaila in the Tadjourah Region of Djibouti.

References

 OurAirports - Djibouti
 Assa-Gueyla
 Google Earth

Airports in Djibouti